Akanbi is both a surname and a given name. Notable people with the name include:

Akanbi Oniyangi (1930–2006), Nigerian politician
Akanbi Wright, Nigerian musician
Mustapha Akanbi (1932–2018), Nigerian lawyer and judge
Solomon Olusola Akanbi, Nigerian bishop

Surnames of Nigerian origin